Lodewyk is a Dutch and Afrikaans given name, equivalent to Louis or Lewis in English. While in modern Dutch the name is spelled Lodewijk, Afrikaans retains Lodewyk. Notable people with the name include:

 Lodewyk van Bercken (fl. 1456), Flemish jeweler and diamond cutter who invented the scaif
 Lodewyk de Deyster (1656–1711), Flemish artist and maker of musical instruments
 William Lodewyk Crowther (1817–1885), Australian politician, Premier of Tasmania 1878–79
 Edward Lodewyk Crowther (1843–1931), Australian politician, son of William
 Christian Lodewyk Stals (born 1935), South African businessperson
 François Philippus Lodewyk Steyn (born 1987), South African rugby player

See also 
 Lode (name)
 Lodewijk
 Ludwig (given name)